Henrique de Meneses (1450–1480) was a Portuguese nobleman, Count of Viana. and Count of Loulé. In 1471, he participated in the conquest of Asilah.

Henrique was born in Portugal, the son of Duarte de Menezes, 3rd Count of Viana and Isabel de Castro. His wife was Guiomar de Bragança, daughter of Fernando I, Duke of Braganza and Joana de Castro.

References 

1450 births
1480 deaths
15th-century Portuguese people
Portuguese nobility
Portuguese Roman Catholics